The Cudgel War (also Club War) was a 1596–1597 peasant uprising in Finland, which was then part of the Kingdom of Sweden. The name of the uprising derives from the fact that the peasants armed themselves with various blunt weapons, such as cudgels, flails and maces, since they were seen as the most efficient weapons against their heavily-armoured enemies. The yeomen also had swords, some firearms and two cannons at their disposal. Their opponents, the troops of Clas Eriksson Fleming, were professional, heavily-armed and armoured men-at-arms.

Modern Finnish historiography sees the uprising in the context of the conflict between Duke Charles and Sigismund, King of Sweden and Poland (War against Sigismund). Charles agitated the peasants to revolt against the nobility of Finland, which supported Sigismund during the conflict.

Background
The 25-year war between the Kingdom of Sweden and the Tsardom of Russia had increased the tax burden, the most hated of which was the "castle camp", i.e. the accommodation, subsistence and payment of wages at the expense of the peasants. The peasants found it intolerable, in particular, that noble and inferior squires who equipped cavalry soldiers for the army were allowed to collect castle camp dues even when the soldiers were not at war, and that Klaus Fleming kept the army in the castle camp for many years after the war to keep it available for his use. There were many abuses and illegalities towards the peasants committed by the nobles and their armies in collecting castle camp dues. Other key explanations for the outbreak of cudgel warfare have included "the burdens of wartime and severe failed harvests, the chaos caused by war fatigue, political provocations, and the exploitation of peasants by a nobility who grew in number and wealth".

War

An uprising began on Christmas Eve 1595 and was initially successful, but shortly thereafter was crushed by cavalry. Officially, the Cudgel War began in Ostrobothnia with an attack by peasants on Isokyrö's church on November 25, 1596. The peasants won a number of encounters with infantry. Klaus Fleming began negotiating a truce that required the surrender of peasant leader Jaakko Ilkka. Ilkka fled to avoid being handed over and the peasant army scattered, pursued by the soldiers. At least 1500 were killed within the next two months. Along with Ilkka, five other rebellion leaders were executed on January 27, 1597.

Israel Larsson was named as the new governor of central and northern Ostrobothnia, and planned to support the rebellion until he fled rather than face Fleming. Leaderless, the peasants attacked on February 24, 1597, and fought their last battle on the Santavuori Hill in Ilmajoki. Over 1,000 were killed and 500 captured.

The insurgents were mostly Finnish peasants from Ostrobothnia, Northern Tavastia, and Savo. The events can also be seen as a part of a larger power struggle between King Sigismund and Duke Charles.

Legacy
In his work Nuijasota, sen syyt ja tapaukset (1857–1859), historian and fennoman Yrjö Koskinen (né Forsman) saw the peasants as fighting for freedom and justice. Fredrika Runeberg's Sigrid Liljeholm (1862), one of the first Finnish historical novels, depicts women's fates during the war. Albert Edelfelt's painting Burned Village (1879) depicts a woman, a child, and an old man hiding behind a rock as a village burns in the background. The poet Kaarlo Kramsu praised the insurgents and lamented their defeat in patriotic poems such as Ilkka, Hannu Krankka, and Santavuoren tappelu, published in Runoelmia (1887). After the Finnish Civil War, the debate has centered on an interpretation that emphasizes Duke Charles's role in inciting the revolt, as found in Pentti Renvall's Kuninkaanmiehiä ja kapinoitsijoita Vaasa-kauden Suomessa (1949); and an explanation that stresses the roots of the rebellion in social injustice and class conflict, as argued by Heikki Ylikangas in Nuijasota (1977). A historical reenactment of the Cudgel War is conducted yearly in the Kavalahti scout camp. Jaakko Ilkka took the 75th place in the Great Finns TV show. A commemorative silver coin was also minted to mark the occasion.

See also 
 War against Sigismund
 Åbo bloodbath

References

Notes

External links
 A dramatized documentary on the Cudgel War
 Annual Cudgel War reenactment

Bibliography 
 Nuijasota by Heikki Ylikangas, Otava, 1996 
 Krohn, J. Kertomuksia Suomen Historiasta, Kansallisseura, Helsinki 1914
 Jaakko Ilkan Suku ry Sukusanomat,2004
 Yli-Hakola, Aila, Ilkka, Jaakko Pentinpoika, Henkilöteksti, 2011

Wars involving Finland
Peasant revolts
Conflicts in 1596
16th-century rebellions
16th century in Finland
1596 in Europe
Wars involving Sweden
Finland–Sweden relations
Rebellions in Finland